John Nieto (1936–2018) was an American contemporary artist who concentrated on Native American themes including Native American tribal representatives as well as indigenous wildlife. He was a longtime resident of Santa Fe, New Mexico.

Biography 
John Wesley Nieto was the 3rd oldest of 14 children born to Natalia Venegas Nieto, who was of Mescalero Apache and Hispanic descent in Denver, Colorado. His father Simon Nieto worked for the U.S. Office of Censorship during WW II, later became a Methodist minister. Nieto's roots can be traced back over 300 years and his work reflects his Hispanic and American Indian ancestry. He earned a Bachelor of Fine Arts from Southern Methodist University in 1959.

Work and recognition 
Nieto presented his painting “Delegate to the White House” to President Reagan in the Oval Office of the White House. which hung during the President’s term in office and later included in the presidential library.  

In 2002 his painting Buffalo Dancer was installed in the Albuquerque International Sunport’s Great Hall.

In 1994 Nieto received the New Mexico Governor's Award for Achievement in the Arts. He served on the Advisory Boards for both the Wheelwright Museum and the Native American Preparatory School.

Nieto is represented in the New Mexico Museum of Fine Arts in Santa Fe.

Public collections
New Mexico Museum of Fine Art Santa Fe, NM
Permanent collection, Marine Corp Museum Washington, DC
The Heard Museum Phoenix, AZ
Capital Art Foundation Santa Fe, NM

References 

American contemporary painters
2018 deaths
American male painters
1936 births
Southern Methodist University alumni
Native American male artists
Mescalero Apache people
Native American painters